Rotem Tene (born 30 March 2001) is an Israeli road and track cyclist, who currently rides for UCI Continental team . He placed fifth in the elimination race at the 2022 UCI Track Cycling World Championships.

Major results

Road
2018
 3rd Time trial, National Junior Road Championships
 7th Overall Tour des Portes du Pays d'Othe
2021
 2nd Road race, National Under-23 Road Championships
2022
 5th Road race, National Road Championships
 5th Grand Prix Nasielsk-Serock
 6th Grand Prix Criquielion
 10th Paris–Tours Espoirs

Track
2020
 3rd Scratch, National Championships
2022
 National Championships
1st  Omnium
2nd Elimination race
3rd Points race

References

External links

2001 births
Living people
Israeli male cyclists
People from Hod HaSharon